Hollywood is an unincorporated community in southern Dunklin County, Missouri, United States. It is located less than one mile from Route 164, approximately twelve miles south of Kennett.

Hollywood got its start ca. 1898 when the railroad was extended to that point. The community was named for the holly near the original town site. A post office called Hollywood was established in 1898, and remained in operation until 1974.

Demographics

References

Unincorporated communities in Dunklin County, Missouri
Unincorporated communities in Missouri